United Nations Security Council Resolution 1999 was adopted without a vote on 13 July 2011 after examining the application of the Republic of South Sudan for membership into the United Nations. The Council recommended to the General Assembly that South Sudan be admitted.

The resolution was adopted following a request from South Sudan President Salva Kiir. South Sudan became the 193rd member of the United Nations.

See also
 Enlargement of the United Nations
 List of United Nations member states
 List of United Nations Security Council Resolutions 1901 to 2000 (2009–2011)

References

External links

Text of the Resolution at undocs.org

 1999
History of South Sudan
 1999
 1999
 1999
2011 in South Sudan
July 2011 events